Eighteen Songs or 18 Songs may refer to:

Eighteen Songs of a Nomad Flute songs on handscroll commissioned by Emperor Gaozong of Song (1107–1187)
18 Essential Songs compilation by Janis Joplin